Genesis may refer to:

Bible
 Book of Genesis, the first book of the biblical scriptures of both Judaism and Christianity, describing the creation of the Earth and of mankind
 Genesis creation narrative, the first several chapters of the Book of Genesis, which describes the origin of the Earth
 Genesis Rabbah, a midrash probably written between 300 and 500 CE with some later additions, comprising a collection of interpretations of the Book of Genesis

Literature and comics
 Genesis (DC Comics), a 1997 DC Comics crossover
 Genesis (Marvel Comics), a Marvel Comics supervillain
 Genesis, a fictional character in the comic book series Preacher
 Genesis, a 1951 story by H. Beam Piper
 Genesis: The Origins of Man and the Universe, a 1982 science text by John Gribbin
 Genesis, a 1988 epic poem by Frederick Turner
 Genesis, a 2000 story by Poul Anderson
 Genesis (novel), a 2006 work by Bernard Beckett
 Genesis, a 2007 story by Paul Chafe
 Genesis (journal), a scientific journal of biology
 Genesis (magazine), a pornographic magazine
 Genesis Publications, a British publishing company
 Genesis, a graphic novel by Nathan Edmondson
 The Book of Genesis (comics), comic-book adaptation illustrated by Robert Crumb

People

Given name
 Génesis Dávila (born 1990), Puerto Rican-American model and beauty pageant titleholder
 Génesis Franchesco (born 1990), Venezuelan female volleyball player
 Genesis Lynea (born 1989), Bermudian-British actress, singer, dancer, and model
 Genesis Potini (1963–2011), New Zealand speed chess player
 Genesis Rodriguez (born 1987), American actress
 Génesis Rodríguez (born 1994), Venezuelan female weightlifter
 Génesis Romero (born 1995), Venezuelan athlete
 Genesis Servania (born 1991), Filipino professional boxer

Surname
 Mercy Genesis (born 1997), Nigerian wrestler

Fictional characters
 Genesis Rhapsodos, main antagonist of the video game Crisis Core: Final Fantasy VII

Music

Artists
 Genesis (band), English rock band
 Génesis (band), Colombian folk rock band
 Genesis (1971–1974), original name for American rock/metal band Vixen
 Genesis P-Orridge (1950–2020), English musician and frontperson of Throbbing Gristle
 Genesis Drum and Bugle Corps, a drum and bugle corp from Austin, Texas

Albums
 Genesis (Busta Rhymes album)
 Genesis (Charles Sullivan album)
 Genesis, album by Coprofago
 Genesis (Diaura album)
 Genesis (Domo Genesis Album)
 Genesis (Elvin Jones album)
 Genesis (Genesis album)
 Genesis (The Gods album)
 Genesis, album by JJ Lin
 Genesis (Job for a Cowboy album)
 Genesis (Joy Williams album)
 Genesis, album by Larry Heard
 Génesis (Mary Ann Acevedo album)
 Genesis (Notaker EP)
 Genesis (Rotting Christ album)
 Genesis (S.H.E album)
 Genesis (Talisman album)
 Genesis, album by The-Dream
 Genesis (Woe, Is Me album)
 The Genesis, album by Yngwie Malmsteen

Songs
 "Genesis", by Ambrose Slade from Beginnings
 "Genesis", by Cult of Luna from The Beyond
 "Genesis", by Deftones from Ohms
 "Genesis", by Devin Townsend from Empath
 "Genesis", by Dua Lipa from Dua Lipa
 "Genesis", by Eir Aoi, from Aldnoah.Zero
 "Genesis", by Ghost, from Opus Eponymous
 "Genesis", by Glass Casket, from Desperate Man's Diary
"Genesis" (Grimes song)
 "Genesis", by Jorma Kaukonen from Quah
 "Genesis", by Justice, from Cross
 "Génesis" (Lucecita Benítez song)
 "Génesis", by Mägo de Oz, from Jesús de Chamberí
 "Genesis" (Matthew Shell and Arun Shenoy song)
 "Genesis" (Michalis Hatzigiannis song)
 "Genesis" by Mumzy Stranger and Yasmin from Journey Begins
 "Genesis", by Northlane, from Singularity
 "Genesis", by Running Wild, from Black Hand Inn
 "Genesis", by The Ventures
 "Genesis" (VNV Nation song)
 "Génesis", by Vox Dei, from La Biblia

Technology
 Genesis, the time and date of the first block of a blockchain data structure
 GENESIS (software), GEneral NEural SImulation System
 Genesis Framework, a theme for the WordPress CMS
 Genesis LPMud, the first MUD of the LPMud family
 Norton 360, codenamed Project Genesis or simply Genesis
 X-COM: Genesis, a computer game
Sega Genesis, a video game console

Television and film

Television
 "Genesis" (Arrow), episode of Arrow
 Genesis (TV series), Filipino television series
 "Genesis" (Heroes), pilot episode of Heroes
 "Genesis" (Quantum Leap episode)
 "Genesis" (Sliders), episode of Sliders
 "Genesis" (Survivors), episode of Survivors
 "Genesis" (Star Trek: The Next Generation), episode of Star Trek: The Next Generation
 Genesis II (film), science fiction TV movie created and produced by Gene Roddenberry
 Genesis Awards, television awards
 Genesis Entertainment, a News Corporation subsidiary
 Genesis Television Network, an American religious network
 TNA Genesis, a professional wrestling pay-per-view and television program
Genesis (2005)
Genesis (2006)
Genesis (2007)
Genesis (2009)
Genesis (2010)
Genesis (2011)
Genesis (2012)
Genesis (2013)
Genesis (2014)
Genesis (2017)
Genesis (2018)
Genesis (2021)
 Zoids: Genesis, fifth anime installment of the Zoids franchise
 Genesis (Air Gear), fictional Air Trek team in Air Gear
 Gênesis, Brazilian telenovela broadcast by RecordTV

Film
 Genesis (1986 film), an Indian film directed by Mrinal Sen Sen
 Genesis (1994 film),  an Italian television film 
 Genesis (1999 film), a Malian film
 Genesis (2004 film), a documentary
 Genesis (2018 Canadian film), a Canadian film
 Genesis (2018 Hungarian film), a Hungarian film
 [REC]³: Genesis, a 2012 Spanish horror film directed by Paco Plaza
 Project Genesis and the Genesis Planet, a fictional technology and the planet created by it in Star Trek II: The Wrath of Khan and Star Trek III: The Search for Spock

Transportation

Vehicles
 Aviomania Genesis Duo G2SA, a Cypriot autogyro design
 Aviomania Genesis Solo G1SA, a Cypriot autogyro design
 Bertone Genesis, a concept truck
 GE Genesis, a locomotive
 Genesis (bikes), a British bicycle brand
 Genesis Motor, luxury vehicle division of Hyundai Motor Company Group.
 Genesis Transport, a bus company in the Philippines
 Oasis class cruise ship, a class of Royal Caribbean cruise ships, formerly known as Project Genesis
 SlipStream Genesis, kit aircraft
 Yamaha FZR600 Genesis, a motorcycle

Spacecraft
 Genesis (spacecraft), a NASA probe that collected solar samples
 Genesis I, a private spacecraft produced by Bigelow Aerospace
 Genesis II (space habitat), a follow-up to Genesis I

Companies
 Genesis, an American cryptocurrency brokerage
 Genesis Energy Limited, a New Zealand electricity generator and retailer
 Genesis HealthCare, a nursing home facility operator
 Genesis Microchip, a semiconductor company acquired by STMicroelectronics in 2007

Other uses
 Genesis (camera), a high-definition camera by Panavision
 Genesis Rock, a sample of lunar crust retrieved by Apollo 15 astronauts
 Sega Genesis, a 16-bit video game console also known as the Mega Drive
 Genesis (tournament), a Super Smash Bros. tournament in the San Francisco Bay Area

See also
 Terminator Genisys, a 2015 science fiction action film and fifth entry in the Terminator series
 Abiogenesis, the origin of life
 Biogenesis, the production of new living organisms
 Genesis Solar Energy Project, a solar power plant in California, United States
 Mass Effect Genesis, an interactive comic attached to the game Mass Effect 2
 Project Genesis (disambiguation)
 Genesys (disambiguation)
 Genisys (disambiguation)
 Gensis (disambiguation)
 Genesis (given name)

Unisex given names